Myawady Football Club is a Burmese football club, based at Nay Pyi Taw, in Nay Pyi Taw Division, Myanmar.

Honours

 2020 MNL-2 (Runner-up)
 2022 Myanmar National League (2nd Runner-up)

2023 Final squad

Statistics

Domestic

Match

Week 17

Week 18

Friendly Match

Friendly Match

Friendly Match

Week 1

Week 2

Week 3

Week 4

Week 5

Week 6

Week 7

Week 8

Week 9

Week 10

Week 11

References

External links
 First Eleven Journal in Burmese
 Soccer Myanmar in Burmese

Football clubs in Myanmar
Association football clubs established in 2009
Myanmar National League clubs
2009 establishments in Myanmar